Route 895 is a  long north to south secondary highway in the southern portion of New Brunswick, Canada.

Route description
The route's northern terminus is in Five Points at Route 112. It follows a river and travels southeast to Price, Synton, Colpitts Settlements, Little River, and Parkindale. The route then turns southeast through Forest Hill and Pleasant Vale and it passes Gowland Mountain. It continues through Mapleton to the southern terminus of Route 905. The route then passes through Elgin, Midland, and Goshen, where it turns north-east towards Portage Vale and ends in Anagance at Route 1.

History

See also

References

895
895